This is a list of singles which reached number-one on the Irish Singles Chart in 1964.

See also
1964 in music
Irish Singles Chart
List of artists who reached number one in Ireland

1964 in Irish music
1964 record charts
1964